Libytheana is a genus of nymphalid butterflies in the snout butterfly subfamily, Libytheinae.

Libytheana carinenta is found in both North and South America and is known to be migratory. The other species in the genus are restricted to the Caribbean.

Classification 

 Source:  The higher classification of Nymphalidae, at Nymphalidae.net
 Note: Names preceded by an equal sign (=) are synonyms, homonyms, rejected names or invalid names.

Subfamily Libytheinae Boisduval, 1833
 Libytheana Michener, 1943
 Libytheana carinenta (Cramer, 1777) (original name = Papilio carinenta Cramer, 1777) type species
 Libytheana carinenta carinenta (Cramer, 1777)
 Libytheana carinenta mexicana Michener, 1943
 Libytheana carinenta bachmanii (Kirtland, 1851) (original name = Libythea bachmanii Kirtland, 1851; = Libythea bachmanii f. kirtlandi Field, 1938)
 Libytheana carinenta larvata (Strecker, 1877)
 Libytheana terena (Godart, 1819) (original name = Libythea terena Godart, 1819)
 Libytheana motya (Hübner, 1823) (original name = Hecaërge motya Hübner, [1823])
 Libytheana fulvescens (Lathy, 1904) (original name = Libythea fulvescens Lathy, 1904)

References 
 Michener, C. D. (1943)

External links 
 
  Libytheana page at Tree of Life

 
Libytheinae
Nymphalidae of South America
Nymphalidae genera
Taxa named by Charles Duncan Michener